Nikos Kazantzakis is a former municipality in the Heraklion regional unit, Crete, Greece. Since the 2011 local government reform it is part of the municipality Archanes-Asterousia, of which it is a municipal unit. It was named after the writer Nikos Kazantzakis. Population 6,433 (2011). The seat of the municipality was in Peza.

Heraklion International Airport has also been named after Nikos Kazantzakis.

References

Populated places in Heraklion (regional unit)